Remi André Hereide (born 25 March 1973) is a Norwegian speed skater. He was born in Bergen. He competed at the 1998 Winter Olympics in Nagano, where he placed 12th in the 5,000 m and 15th in the 10,000 m.

References

External links

1973 births
Living people
Sportspeople from Bergen
Norwegian male speed skaters
Olympic speed skaters of Norway
Speed skaters at the 1998 Winter Olympics
20th-century Norwegian people